Robert Dunlap may refer to:

Robert H. Dunlap (1879–1931), United States Marine Corps brigadier general
Robert Hugo Dunlap (1920–2000), United States Marine Corps, World War II Medal of Honor recipient
Robert Dunlap (playwright) (1766–1839), American playwright
Robert P. Dunlap (1794–1859), former Governor of Maine
Robert Rankin Dunlap (1515–1992), American lawyer and politician